Warta is a town in Sieradz County, Łódź Voivodeship, Poland, with 3,208 inhabitants (2020). It is situated on the Warta River.

History

Warta was granted town rights in 1255 by Duke Casimir I of Kuyavia of the Piast dynasty. It was a royal town of the Polish Crown, administratively located in the Sieradz Voivodeship in the Greater Poland Province of the Polish Crown. One of two main routes connecting Warsaw and Dresden ran through the town in the 18th century and Kings Augustus II the Strong and Augustus III of Poland often traveled that route.

Shortly before World War II about 50 percent of the town's population was Jewish. When the Germans invaded Poland in September 1939, they immediately brutalized the population. Some Poles from Warta were murdered by the Wehrmacht already on September 7, 1939 in the nearby village of Wylazłów. During the German occupation, Jews were kidnapped them for forced labor, robbed of their possessions, and in early 1940, forced into a ghetto, leaving behind their furniture and other possessions for locals and Germans to take. In April 1940, the Germans murdered 499 patients of the local psychiatric hospital as part of Aktion T4. The next 82 patients were murdered by in June 1941. In both cases, patients were gassed in a gas van. In spring 1942, several Jews, including the rabbi, were hung, allegedly for sending bread to Jews who had been sent to forced labor camps.  In August 1942, all Jews were rounded up and held in a church for three days with nothing to eat.  Some died from hunger and thirst, others were shot there.  Afterwards, around 1,000 were sent to the Chełmno extermination camp where they were immediately gassed. Another few hundred were sent to the Łódź Ghetto. The number of pre-war Warta Jewish survivors is unclear; at least 50 and perhaps close to 200.  More than 40 registered there  after the war, but two by the names of Moshe Szajniak and Meir Rozewald were killed by Eugeniusz "Groźny" Kokolski and his group of millitant anti-communists(now regarded among Poland's "Cursed Soldiers") who raided the town after the war ended, and the others left the town.

Gallery

References

Cities and towns in Łódź Voivodeship
Warta
Sieradz Voivodeship (1339–1793)
Kalisz Governorate
Łódź Voivodeship (1919–1939)
Holocaust locations in Poland